John the Baptist is a sculpture by the Baroque artist Alonzo Cano, housed in the National Sculpture Museum, Valladolid.
The sculpture was made by the artist for the church of San Juan de la Palma, during his Seville period.

In 1634 the Parish of Saint John the Baptist commissioned painter Juan del Castillo and retable joiner Miguel Cano, father of Alonso, a retable to include paintings and the central sculpture of Saint John. It was carved by Alonso Cano inspired by Martínez Montañés’ St. John the Baptist from St. Anne's convent (Seville).
The sculpture is characterized by its idealized naturalism.

External links
 National Museum of Sculpture
 Saint John the Baptist – Google Cultural Institute

1630s sculptures